The Read School is a historic schoolhouse at 1670 Flat River Road in Coventry, Rhode Island, USA. Built c. 1831, it is one of the oldest, and the best-preserved, of Coventry's 19th-century schoolhouses. The south side, its main facade, has a pair of doors under a ten-light transom window and a shallow entry cover. Above this is a round window, a detail echoed on the north side. It served the town as a school until 1951, and was then used for storage. It is now leased by the town to the Coventry Historical Society, who conduct tours and hold meetings there.

The building was listed on the National Register of Historic Places in 2002.

Images

See also
National Register of Historic Places listings in Kent County, Rhode Island

References

External links
Coventry Historic Society

School buildings on the National Register of Historic Places in Rhode Island
School buildings completed in 1831
Educational institutions established in 1831
Schools in Kent County, Rhode Island
Buildings and structures in Coventry, Rhode Island
National Register of Historic Places in Kent County, Rhode Island